The Sivaprakasa Visagam is a collection of poems in Tamil written by Siva Prakasar. Shaiva Siddhanta.

Overview
These Poems   are composed in favour of 'Sivagna Balaya Swamigal of Pomma Pura Aaddeenam.

Poet
Siva prakasar, a Tamil Phiolospher, Sage, Poet lived at the end of 17th century.

Pommair palayam and SivaPrakasar
Sivaprakasa Swamigal travelled widely all over Tamil Nadu temples. He met Santhalinga Swamigal along his way. They planned to see Mailam Murugan Temple. There they met Sivagnaana Balaya Swamigal. Perur Santhalinga Swamigal persuaded him to sing about  Sri Sivagnaana Balya Swamigal. But Siva Prakasar told him that He will sing and praise only Lord Muruga not about human beings. On that night Lord Muruga appeared in his dream and told him that I am the one raised again as Sivagnaana Balaya Swamigal. so nothing wrong to sing about him. He started singing the hymns on that day onwards.

Then Siva prakasa Swamigal became the First and Prime disciple of Sivagnaana Balaya Swamigal.

Verses and explanation
Great poet Sivaprakasar, who was blessed as 'Sivanuputhichelvar' by the grace of Aadhi Sivagnaana Balaya Swamigal has composed thirty two volumes of poetry in praise of Lord Shiva and Sri Sivagnana Balaya Swamigal.
In the following five works of significance, he explains us the wisdom of his guru, which he had experienced personally.

Books about Sivagna Bala Swamigal, Pommapura Aadeenam
 Sivaprakasa Visagam                                         
 Sivagna Bala swamigal Thaalattu 
 Sivagna Bala swamigal Thirupalli ezuchi                      
 Sivagna Bala swamigal Pillai Thamizh
 Sivagna Bala swamigal Nenjuvedu Thoothu                    
 * Sivagna Bala swamigal Kalambagam

References

Tamil-language literature
Shaiva texts
17th-century books